Mary Evelyn Frankau, née Atkinson (20 June 1899 in London – 20 July 1974), writing as M. E. Atkinson, was a prolific English children’s writer.

She was best known for her series on the Lockett family Series - children's adventure stories typical of the 1940s and 1950s, and written from a middle class viewpoint. Her Fricka series was mostly about ponies, and was generally viewed as only middling quality for the genre. Although never in the first rank of children's writers, she was especially good at creating un-stereotyped and interesting characters. Her earlier works were better received critically than her later works.

Bibliography

One-act plays
Here Lies Matilda 1931
The Day's Good Cause 1935
The Chimney Corner: A Play for Women in One Act" 1936*"T
Beginner's Luck 1936
Crab-Apple Harvest 1936
Going Rustic 1936
Can the Leopard? 1939

Lockett series
August Adventure 1936
Mystery Manor 1937 
The Compass Points North 1938 
Smugglers' Gap 1939
Going Gangster 1940
Crusoe Island 1941
Challenge to Adventure 1942
The Monster of Widgeon Weir 1943
The Nest of the Scarecrow 1944
Problem Party 1945
Chimney Cottage 1947
The House on the Moor 1948
The Thirteenth Adventure 1949
Steeple Folly 1950

Fricka series
Castaway Camp 1951
Hunter's Moon 1952
The Barnstormers 1953
Unexpected Adventure 1955
Riders and Raids 1955

Other stories
Horseshoes and Handlebars 1958
Where there's a Will ... 1961

References 

1899 births
1974 deaths
English children's writers
20th-century English novelists
20th-century British women writers
Writers from London